Ophelia complex is the term used by Gaston Bachelard to refer to the links between femininity, liquids, and drowning which he saw as symbolised in the fate of Shakespeare's Ophelia.

Main theme
Bachelard traced in Romanticism a nexus of ideas linking the dissolution of the self  - male or female - with immersion in the feminine element of water, as symbolised by Ophelia's drowning.

Literary offshoots
Federico García Lorca explored the image of water and a despairing sexuality, epitomised in the Ophelia complex, throughout his writings.

Exteriorised adolescence
A later, and unconnected use of the terms Ophelia complex/Ophelia syndrome was introduced by Mary Pipher in her Reviving Ophelia of 1994.  There she argued for a view of Shakespeare's character as lacking inner direction, and externally defined by men (father/brother); and suggested that similar external pressures were currently faced by post-pubescent girls. The danger of the Ophelia syndrome was that of abandoning a rooted childhood self, for an apparently more sophisticated but over-externalised facade self.

See also

References

Further reading
G. Bachelard, L'Eau et les reves (Paris 1942)

External links 
 Ophelia and Isabella

Psychoanalytic terminology
Analytical psychology
Complex (psychology)
Freudian psychology